Claver, officially the Municipality of Claver (Surigaonon: Lungsod nan Claver), is a 2nd class municipality in the province of Surigao del Norte, Philippines. According to the 2020 census, it has a population of 36,033 people.

The town can be reached by bus, van-for-hire and jeepney from the Surigao Integrated Bus & Jeepney Terminal or at any point along the national highway. Its patron saint is St. Peter Claver and fiesta is celebrated every ninth day of September.

A large part of the municipal land area is a mining reservation due to extensive mineral deposits. This includes the Nickel ore loading port at Taganito, located 10 kilometers from the town proper of Claver, on the banks of Taganito river.

History

World War II
Claver was one of many coastal towns that for some time were ignored after the American and Filipino military forces surrendered to the Japanese in May 1942. Claver became the headquarters of the 114th Infantry Regiment of 10th Military District, which was the guerrilla organization under the jurisdiction of the United States Army. Some residents had fled for fear of a Japanese raid or occupation of the town, but an American whose family took refuge there said Claver still had a feeling of normalcy to it. On a hill above town the guerrillas maintained a radio station by which they kept in contact with other military units. The radio operator decided, without the knowledge of his superiors, to jam wavelengths used by the Japanese. The Japanese got a fix on the location of the station as a result.

On November 30, 1943, the Japanese took action to put the radio station out of business. Very early in the morning several Japanese ships appeared off the coast and began shelling the town with five-inch guns. After a prolonged shelling, Japanese troops landed and destroyed the radio station. The guerrillas left as the Japanese entered town and moved their headquarters elsewhere. Because the town had supported the guerrillas, the town was ransacked. The troops then returned to the ships, which left.

Most of the residents fled south to avoid the Japanese, who did not occupy Claver. Claver remained almost abandoned until the end of the war.

Geography
In the north-east, Claver is bounded by the Pacific Ocean, to the west by the town of Gigaquit, and to the south by the boundary town of Carrascal, Surigao del Sur.

Barangays
Claver is politically divided into 14 barangays:
 Bagakay (Pob. West)
 Cabugo
 Cagdianao
 Daywan
 Hayanggabon
 Ladgaron (Poblacion)
 Lapinigan
 Magallanes
 Panatao
 Sapa
 Taganito
 Tayaga (Pob. East)
 Urbiztondo
 Wangke

The Mamanwa village of Toyatoya is located in Barangay Urbiztondo.

Climate

Demographics

Economy

Claver is primarily a mining town with iron, nickel, copper and silver deposits on its Pulang Lupan mountains which are exploited mainly by the Taganito Mining Corporation. Mining, trading, and -traditionally - farming and fishing are the main sources of livelihood among residents. Fishing has become increasingly difficult due to water pollution as a consequence of mining activities.

References

External links
 Claver Profile at PhilAtlas.com
 Claver Profile at the DTI Cities and Municipalities Competitive Index
 [ Philippine Standard Geographic Code]
 Philippine Census Information
 https://web.archive.org/web/20140201233832/http://www.surigaodelnorte.gov.ph/index.php?option=com_content&view=article&id=75&Itemid=112
 gov.ph
 https://web.archive.org/web/20140204025455/http://www.blgs.gov.ph/lgpmsv2/cmshome/index.php?pageID=23&frmIdDcfCode=7&fLguType=CM&frmIdRegion=16&frmIdProvince=85&frmIdLgu=1585

Municipalities of Surigao del Norte
Mining communities in the Philippines